Kelvin Patrick Yondani (born 9 October 1984) is a Tanzanian football player who plays a defending position. He currently plays for Geita Gold.

Yondan is also a member of the Tanzania national football team.

The team served 

 Simba Sc 2008-2013
 Young African Sc 2013 until now

His personal football skills 
He is among the best of eastern Africa, for more than a decade now he creates the shield of Young Africans. His aerial prowess is amongst the best in the Tanzanian league, dealing with balls that are both high and low. He is known for getting stuck in and playing long balls.

References

 Kelvin Yondani at RSSSF
 

1984 births
Living people
Tanzanian footballers
Tanzania international footballers
Simba S.C. players
Young Africans S.C. players
People from Dar es Salaam
Association football defenders
2019 Africa Cup of Nations players
Tanzanian Premier League players
Tanzania A' international footballers
2009 African Nations Championship players